Ji'an railway station may refer to the following stations:
Ji'an railway station (Jiangxi), in Jiangxi Province, China
Ji'an railway station (Taiwan), in Hualien County, Taiwan

See also
Ji'an (disambiguation)